The beach volleyball tournaments at the 1999 Pan American Games were held 29 July – 4 August 1999 in Winnipeg, Canada.

Men's tournament

Women's tournament

Medal table

See also
 Volleyball at the 1999 Pan American Games

References
 
 

Events at the 1999 Pan American Games
1999
Pan American Games